Tiger Claws is a 1991 film directed by Kelly Makin and starring Cynthia Rothrock, Jalal Merhi, and Bolo Yeung. It is notable for being the film that, according to Canuxploitation.com, introduced the world to Film One Productions, a company started by Jalal Merhi who also co-starred in the film, although Fearless Tiger, another Film One production, was released the previous year in Canada, but would not be released in the United States until 1994.

Plot
The police investigate a serial killer (Bolo Yeung) who seems to target only martial arts masters. One after another is killed in the same brutal fashion. This may be a chance for detective Linda Masterson to work on her first murder case. She is assigned the job and to assist her is another martial arts specialist, Sgt. Tarek Richards. Now they need to find a tiger style master, because the killer obviously uses tiger-style kung fu. Not a simple task, since tiger is a very ancient and rare style.

Sgt. Richards decides to renew his training in tiger style in order to better prepare himself for the eventual confrontation with the serial killer. He manages to track down the serial killer and engages him in combat where he ultimately defeats him.

Availability
After a quick run at the American Film Market, the film was released on videocassette and laserdisc in the summer of 1992 in the United States by MCA/Universal Home Video and that same year in Canada by Cineplex Odeon.

Sequels
The film was followed by Tiger Claws 2, and Tiger Claws 3: The Final Conflict.

External links
 

1992 films
Canadian action films
1991 martial arts films
English-language Canadian films
1992 directorial debut films
Films directed by Kelly Makin
1990s English-language films
1990s Canadian films